Semperdon rotanus is a species of small, air-breathing land snails, terrestrial pulmonate gastropod mollusks in the family Charopidae. This species is found in Guam and Northern Mariana Islands.

References

 GNI global names.org info

Semperdon
Gastropods described in 1983
Taxonomy articles created by Polbot